Sellwood Park is a city park of about  in southeast Portland, in the U.S. state of Oregon.

Description and history
Located at Southeast Seventh Avenue and Miller Street, the park includes courts for tennis and basketball; fields for soccer, baseball, softball, and football; picnic areas; a horseshoe pit; a playground; paved and unpaved paths, and restrooms. The Springwater Corridor trail runs north–south along the west side of the park between it and Sellwood Riverfront Park and Oaks Amusement Park. Oaks Bottom Wildlife Refuge is just north of Sellwood Park.

References

External links
 

1909 establishments in Oregon
Parks in Portland, Oregon
Protected areas established in 1909
Sellwood-Moreland, Portland, Oregon
Urban public parks